Oleh Kvych (born 12 September 1996 in Uzhhorod, Zakarpattia Oblast, Ukraine) is a professional Ukrainian football forward who plays for 1. SC Znojmo FK in the Moravian–Silesian Football League.

Career
In the summer 2019, Kvych joined 1. SC Znojmo FK.

References

External links
http://oleh-kvych.eu
Profile at FC Zbrojovka Brno official site

1996 births
Living people
Sportspeople from Uzhhorod
Ukrainian footballers
Ukrainian expatriate footballers
FC Zbrojovka Brno players
Stal Rzeszów players
1. SC Znojmo players
Association football midfielders
Ukrainian expatriate sportspeople in Poland
Ukrainian expatriate sportspeople in the Czech Republic
Expatriate footballers in Poland
Expatriate footballers in the Czech Republic
Czech National Football League players
Ukrainian First League players
Ukrainian Second League players